Chris Armstrong or Christopher Armstrong may refer to:
Chris Armstrong (footballer, born 1971), former Crystal Palace and Tottenham Hotspur football player
Chris Armstrong (footballer, born 1982), former Sheffield United football player  
Chris Armstrong (footballer, born 1984), Galway United football player
Chris Armstrong (ice hockey) (born 1975), Canadian ice hockey player
Chris Armstrong (Canadian football) (born 1967), former Canadian football player
C. W. Armstrong (1899–1986), Northern Irish politician
Christopher Armstrong (born 1947), current Dean of Blackburn
Chris Armstrong (piper), Pipe Major of the ScottishPower Pipe Band